William Byron Morrow (September 8, 1911 – May 11, 2006) was an American television and film actor.

Early life
Born in Chicago, Illinois, Morrow served in the Army in World War II, performing in theater productions during his tour of duty. He began appearing in film and television in the late 1950s and amassed some 200 appearances in a career spanning the next 35 years.

Morrow's television work ran from Peter Gunn in the late 1950s to Father Dowling Mysteries in 1991. He mostly played authority figures, often in uniform.

Career
He made seven appearances as a judge in CBS's Perry Mason and played real-life Admiral Chester Nimitz in the pilot episode of NBC's Baa Baa Black Sheep, starring Robert Conrad.

In 1961 Morrow appeared in an episode of The Tab Hunter Show. In 1961 and 1962, he was cast as Captain Keith Gregory in the episodes "No Fat Cops" and "The Deadlier Sex" of the ABC crime drama The New Breed, starring Leslie Nielsen.  In 1962 Morrow appeared as Judge Cornwall on the TV western The Virginian in the episode titled "The Accomplice." 

He appeared in Bewitched in 1965 as councilman Kavanaugh season 1 episode 34.   He appeared in two episodes of the original series of NBC's Star Trek - in "Amok Time" as Admiral Komack, and in "For the World is Hollow and I Have Touched the Sky" as Admiral Westervliet (per the episode's closing credits; the name is omitted from dialogue). This was the first appearance of an admiral in the original series.

In 1971 Morrow appeared as Harkin on "The Men From Shiloh" (rebranded name for the TV western The Virginian) in the episode titled "The Politician."

In 1973, he had the role of Admiral Phillips in the ABC-TV movie The President's Plane is Missing.

Morrow may be most-seen today in an uncredited appearance as Mr. Jameson, one of the poker players in the train scene of The Sting.

Byron Morrow also appeared in the first season of Barnaby Jones; episode titled, "A Little Glory, A Little Death"(04/29/1973).

Death
Morrow died at the age of 94 on 11 May 2006 at the Motion Picture and Television Country House and Hospital in Woodland Hills, California.

Filmography

References

External links

 

American male television actors
1911 births
2006 deaths
20th-century American male actors
United States Army personnel of World War II